The Gossau–Wasserauen railway line is a metre-gauge adhesion railway of the Appenzell Railways (Appenzeller Bahnen; AB). It runs from Gossau via Appenzell to Wasserauen in Switzerland and is given the abbreviation of GAW by the operator. The connection was built and electrified in several stages by different companies and has been operating continuously since 1949.

History
The line was developed in the following stages:
 Gossau SG–Herisau, opened on 1 October 1913 by the Appenzell Railway (Appenzeller Bahn, which has been called the Appenzeller Bahnen since 1988), replacing the St. Gallen Winkeln–Herisau section, opened on 12 April 1875
 Herisau–Urnäsch, opened on 21 September 1875 by the Schweizerische Gesellschaft für Localbahnen (Swiss company for local railways; called the Appenzell Railway from 1885)
 Urnäsch–Appenzell, opened on 16 August (to Gontenbad) and 29 October 1886 by the Appenzell Railway
 Gossau–Appenzell has been operated electrically with 1500 volts DC since 23 April 1933

In order to be able to carry standard-gauge wagons on the metre-gauge network, a Rollbock system was opened in Gossau on 1 July 1978, allowing operations on the Gossau–Wasserauen route. Rollbock operations were extended on the Appenzell–Gais–Teufen route from 1989. Goods traffic ended by the end of 2003 and the Rollbock system was taken out of service on 1 August 2010.

Operation

This is designated as line S23 of the St. Gallen S-Bahn.

Route 
  –  –  – 

 Gossau SG
 Herisau
  (stops only on request)
 
  (stops only on request)
 
  (stops only on request)
  (stops only on request)
  (stops only on request)
 Appenzell
  (stops only on request)
 
  (stops only on request)
 Wasserauen

References

Footnotes

Sources

Metre gauge railways in Switzerland
Railway lines opened in 1875
1875 establishments in Switzerland